West End is a constituency of the Anguillan House of Assembly. The incumbent, elected in the 2020 Anguillian general election is Cardigan Connor of the Anguilla United Front.

Representatives

Election results

Elections in the 2020s

|- class="vcard" 
  | style="background-color:"|
  | class="org" style="width: 130px" | AUF
  | class="fn" |Cardigan Connor
  | style="text-align:right;" | 286
  | style="text-align:right;" | 46.1
  | style="text-align:right;" | -9.3

Elections in the 2010s

Elections in the 2000s

Elections in the 1990s

Elections in the 1980s

External links
Constituency results on the government's website. 

Constituencies of the Anguillan House of Assembly